Henry Edward Pamplin Lewis (5 June 1880 – 29 October 1946) was an Australian rules footballer who played with Carlton in the Victorian Football League (VFL).

Notes

External links 

Harry Lewis's profile at Blueseum

1880 births
1946 deaths
Australian rules footballers from Melbourne
Carlton Football Club players
People from Carlton, Victoria